Neftchiler Avenue (literally Oil Worker's Avenue) is an  arterial road in Baku, Azerbaijan. It begins at the west end of the Bayil district of Baku and continues east until terminating at Javanshir Bridge (formerly Gagarin Bridge) intersecting Uzeyir Hajibeyov Street. It is used as part of the Baku City Circuit, including the Start-Finish straight located next to Government House 

Previous names of Neftchilar Avenue were Alexander II Quay, Gubanov Quay, and Stalin Avenue. The street was named Neftchilar Avenue in 1961 in honour of workers of oil industry in Azerbaijan. The larger section of the avenue runs along Baku Boulevard.

Notable buildings and monuments

 Оffice of State Oil Fund of Azerbaijan
 State Maritime Administration of Azerbaijan Republic
 International Mugam Center of Azerbaijan
 Maiden Tower
 Baku Puppet Theatre
 Azerbaijan National Carpet Museum
 Government House
 Baku port
 National Flag Square

Gallery

Notes

External links
Old street and square names in Baku

Streets in Baku